Marcello d'Aste (1657–1709) was a Roman Catholic cardinal.

Biography
On 13 Jan 1692, he was consecrated bishop by Galeazzo Marescotti, Cardinal-Priest of Santi Quirico e Giulitta, with Giuseppe Bologna, Archbishop of Capua, and Stefano Giuseppe Menatti, Titular Bishop of Cyrene, serving as co-consecrators.

Episcopal succession

References 

1657 births
1709 deaths
17th-century Italian cardinals
Apostolic Nuncios to Switzerland
18th-century Italian cardinals